Coorg frog may refer to:

 Coorg night frog (Nyctibatrachus sanctipalustris), a frog in the family Nyctibatrachidae endemic to the Western Ghats, India
 Coorg yellow bush frog (Raorchestes luteolus), a frog in the family Rhacophoridae endemic to the Western Ghats, India

Animal common name disambiguation pages